William or Bill Hagerty may refer to:

 William W. Hagerty (1916–1986), teacher, NASA adviser, and president of Drexel University
 Bill Hagerty (William Francis Hagerty IV, born 1959), United States senator, ambassador to Japan and economic consultant
 Bill Hagerty (newspaper editor), British newspaperman

See also

 Hagerty (disambiguation)
 William (disambiguation)
 Will (disambiguation)
 Bill (disambiguation)